In aerodynamics, the Crow instability, or V.C.I. vortex crow instability, is an inviscid line-vortex instability, named after its discoverer S. C. Crow.
The Crow instability is most commonly observed in the skies behind large aircraft such as the Boeing 747. It occurs when the wingtip vortices interact with contrails from the engines, producing visible distortions in the shape of the contrail.

Instability development 
The Crow instability is a vortex pair instability, and typically goes through several stages:
A pair of counter rotating vortices act upon each other to amplify small sinusoidal distortions in their vortex shapes (normally created by some initial disturbance in the system).
The waves develop into either symmetric or anti-symmetric modes, depending on the nature of the initial disturbance.
These distortions grow, both through interaction from one vortex on another, and also 'Self Induction' of a vortex with itself. This leads to an exponential growth in the vortex wave amplitude.
The vortex amplitudes reach a critical value and reconnect, forming a chain of vortex rings.

References

External links 
 Scientific American: The Crow Instability
 Photos: The Crow Instability

Meteorological phenomena